The 2017 Men's Australian Hockey League was 27th edition of the men's Australian Hockey League. The tournament was held between 28 September and 8 October 2017, in Perth, Western Australia. A total of 10 teams competed for the title.

Like the 2016 edition, invitational teams from India and New Zealand competed in the tournament.

The VIC Vikings won the tournament for the fourth time and the second year in a row, following a 3–0 penalty shoot-out win over the QLD Blades after the final finished a 1–1 draw. The NSW Waratahs won the bronze medal after defeating the India Development side 3–2 in the third place match.

Competition format
Teams were split evenly into pools A and B where they compete in a single round-robin format.

At the conclusion of the initial pool stage, the top two teams in each pool progress to the medal playoffs in Pool C, while the remaining six teams progress to the classification matches in Pool D.

In Pool C, teams carry over points earned in previous matches and contest the teams they are yet to play. Final ranking in Pool C determines the final tournament standing from fifth to tenth place.

In Pool D, teams carry over points earned in previous matches and contest the teams they are yet to play. The top two teams then progress to the final, while the bottom two teams contest the third and fourth place playoff.

Participating teams

Results

First round

Pool A

Pool B

Second round

Fifth to tenth place classification

Pool D

First to fourth place classification

Pool C

Third and fourth place

Final

Awards

Statistics

Final standings

Goalscorers

References

External links

2017
2017 in Australian field hockey
2017 in Indian sport
2017 in New Zealand sport